Shadrick "Mac" McAfee (born September 22, 1974) is the former head coach of the Louisiana Swashbucklers of the Arena Football League, and a former player of several professional leagues.

Career
McAfee attended Philadelphia High School in Mississippi. He played college football at NCAA Division II Mississippi College, and after two years transferred to the University of Central Arkansas. In 1998, he was named all Gulf South Conference at running back.

Professionally, McAfee spent time with teams of the National Football League, Canadian Football League, Regional Football League, Arena Football League 2, National Indoor Football League, Intense Football League, and Indoor Football League. He played running back, wide receiver, defensive back, linebacker, and kick returner in his career.

Personal

McAfee is one of several family members that played professional sports. A few of notable family members that played professional sports are Marcus Dupree (NFL, USFL, WWE,) Fred McAfee (NFL-New Orleans Saints, Pittsburgh Steelers, Arizona Cardinals, Tampa Bay Bucs), Tyrone Rush ( NFL- Washington Redskins, CFL-Montreal Alouettes, EFL Bergamo Lions), Pashen Thompson (ABL-Columbus Conquest, US Olympic Team)

References

1974 births
Living people
Players of American football from Mississippi
Regional Football League players
Lafayette Roughnecks players
Louisiana Swashbucklers players
Bossier–Shreveport Battle Wings players
People from Philadelphia, Mississippi